The Breen are a fictional extraterrestrial species featured in the Star Trek science fiction franchise. They were first mentioned in "The Loss", a fourth-season episode of Star Trek: The Next Generation which first aired in 1990. References to them were made in several other Next Generation episodes, but they did not appear until the 1996 fourth season Star Trek: Deep Space Nine episode "Indiscretion". On Deep Space Nine, they played a significant role in the final story arc of the series in 1999, during which much information about them was revealed. The Breen's true appearance remains unknown to viewers, as they have never been seen without their helmets.

Production history
The Breen were first mentioned in "The Loss", a fourth-season episode of Star Trek: The Next Generation which first aired in 1990. The episode established their race as one of several alien species to be unreadable by empaths, much like the Ferengi. References to them were made in several other Next Generation ("Hero Worship" S05 E11) and Star Trek: Voyager episodes but they were not seen until the 1996 Deep Space Nine episode "Indiscretion", which aired as part of that show's fourth season. They were depicted as running a mining facility from which Gul Dukat and Major Kira rescued Dukat's daughter, Tora Ziyal. According to DS9 writer/producer Robert Hewitt Wolfe, after having previously been treated as red herrings since their first mention on Next Generation, and as a running joke by the production staff because "they were these people who were out there who were dangerous but were never really responsible for any of the trouble going on", they would finally be used as the villains in an episode. Their true appearance would be concealed beneath masks, according to writer/producer Ira Steven Behr, because "I wasn't really in the mood to come up with a new alien race. So I said, 'Let's not see them. Let's just put them in costume because they normally live in the cold.'"

The look of the Breen masks, which includes a "snout", was derived from the visual suggestion that they are a snouted species, like an Arctic wolf. The Breen costumes were problematic for the actors playing them, since they made both seeing and breathing difficult: there was only a single small hole in the beak, about eight inches from the actor's nose, according to stand-in and stunt double Todd Slayton, who played Thot Gor. The costumes also included big, clumsy boots, and the outfits were layered like an armadillo, making movement difficult. The helmets, which were complicated to put on and remove, were held together with magnets, and were prone to falling off when someone bumped into them. The switches for the lights on the helmets were inside the helmets, requiring the actor to remove the helmet to turn the lights on and off. For reasons unknown to production personnel, the nine-volt batteries that powered the lights lasted only minutes before burning out.

In keeping with the Breen as a mysterious race, the sounds of the Breen's speech were inspired by the Lou Reed album Metal Machine Music, which the post-production sound staff were instructed to listen to when creating the electronic cackle that served as the Breen's voices.

History and culture 
The Breen homeworld is called Breen, according to the 1999 Star Trek: Deep Space Nine episode "'Til Death Do Us Part", and was said to be a frozen wasteland in "Indiscretion". However, in the 1999 episode "The Changing Face of Evil", it was stated by Weyoun that it is in fact rather temperate. Among the Breen, pregnancy at a young age was a common occurrence, according to "Elogium", a 1995 second season Star Trek: Voyager episode, though it has not been established what is considered "young" in the Breen culture. The Breen have no blood. How the functions normally carried out by blood in other species are carried out in Breen physiology has not been revealed. Although the Breen diet is unknown, Lieutenant Commander Worf and Ezri Dax were given algae paste when they were prisoners of the Breen in "'Til Death Do Us Part".

Historically, the Klingons were among the first to discover the consequences of underestimating the Breen. As revealed in "'Til Death Do Us Part", during the Klingon Second Empire, Chancellor Mow'ga ordered an entire fleet of Klingon warships to invade and conquer the Breen homeworld. The fleet never returned and was never heard from again. The Romulans have a saying: "Never turn your back on a Breen". This adage was first stated (and illustrated) in the 1997 fifth season Deep Space Nine episode "By Inferno's Light", in which a captive Breen grabbed a disruptor pistol from the holster of a Dominion guard, whose back was turned to him in a Dominion asteroid prison, and used it to disintegrate two Dominion guards at the same time as one of them killed the captive. The Breen in question had not done anything besides sit quietly up until that point, giving no indication that he would be a threat.

The Breen established the isolated Breen Confederacy in the Alpha Quadrant (the quadrant of the Milky Way in which Earth is located, as well as the homeworlds of the Ferengi, Cardassians, and portions of the Klingon Empire and Romulan Star Empire). The Breen established outposts near the Black Cluster, according to the 1992 fifth season Next Generation episode "Hero Worship". They also established mining facilities consisting of Breen guards and slaves kidnapped from spaceships, such as Tora Ziyal, the half-Bajoran daughter of the Cardassian Gul Dukat, whose ship, the Ravinok, had crashed on the planet Dozaria, which was controlled by the Breen, as established in "Indiscretion".

In "Hero Worship" it is mentioned that they have always been politically nonaligned. They later become a powerful ally of the Dominion, a Gamma Quadrant empire, during the Dominion War that was fought during the final two seasons of Deep Space Nine. The Breen were revealed to have allied with the Dominion in "’Til Death Do Us Part", the second episode of the nine-episode story arc that served as the final story arc of Deep Space Nine in 1999. After this occurred, the Breen attacked Earth, destroying parts of San Francisco before being repulsed. They also proved a powerful foe during the Battle of Chin'toka, in which they fought alongside the Cardassians and Dominion against an alliance of the Federation, the Klingon Empire and the Romulan Star Empire. During this battle, the Breen helped destroy a fleet of the alliance's ships, including the USS Defiant. The Breen also assumed great responsibility in military matters. The leading representatives of the Breen Confederacy, called "Thots" (which Damar, leader of the Cardassian military, compares to his own rank of Legate, in the episode “Strange Bedfellows”), such as Thot Gor and Thot Pran, were given more powers, much to the bitterness of Damar, whose own people had earlier joined the Dominion. This was one of the factors which led to Damar changing sides and leading a rebellion to free Cardassia. After the Cardassians turned against the Dominion, the Dominion and the Breen were defeated in the Battle of Cardassia Prime in Deep Space Nine's series finale, "What You Leave Behind". The Breen's status with respect to the Dominion after this has not been mentioned onscreen since "What You Leave Behind", and is therefore unknown in canon.

Non-canonical information
In Zero Sum Game, the first novel in the 2010 - 2012 series Star Trek: Typhon Pact, writer David Alan Mack establishes that the Breen Confederacy is made up of many separate species, all of which wear suits to disguise their appearances and subsume their identities into the Breen name. The known Breen species are:
The Amoniri, whose bodies have no blood and which require refrigeration in their suits to survive
The Fenrisal, whose pronounced snouts give shape to the traditional Breen helmet
The Paclu, who have four-lobed brains that cannot be read by most telepathic species
The Silwaan, whose appearance is most humanlike of the Breen subspecies
The Vironat, a gray-skinned multi-limbed species (introduced in the sixth novel in the series, Plagues of Night by David R. George III)

Technology and equipment 
In "Scorpion", 1997 the third-season finale of Star Trek: Voyager, Lieutenant Tuvok states that the Breen use organic technology in their ships when discussing the bio-organic starships of Species 8472. Their ships are armed with cloaking devices and disruptor-type weapons, according to "Hero Worship".

In Star Trek Generations Riker mentions the Breen as one of only three species with access to Type-III hand-held disruptors.

During the Battle of Chin'toka, a Dominion War battle that occurred in the episode "The Changing Face of Evil", the Breen employ an energy-damping weapon that could shut down all systems on Alliance ships. The Klingons subsequently discover an engine modification that renders Klingon ships immune to this weapon, though it does not work on Federation or Romulan ships since they are powered differently. The Breen used this weapon to great effect, completely immobilising the USS Defiant, and a fleet of alliance ships, allowing the Breen to destroy them at their leisure.

The helmet of the Breen suits consists of a visor that either glows green, or has small green and red lights on it, and a detachable "beak". The Breen's suits come in two types. The first is a standard suit that is worn by most of the Breen. The second is a more ornate version worn by Thots or other officials that has gold lining and distinctive gold stripes running down the top of the helmet and the "beak", as seen in later episodes of Deep Space Nine, such as "Strange Bedfellows".

The non-canonical book Legends of the Ferengi claims that the Ferengi were sold warp technology by a Breen they called "the Masked Breen" (because they did not know the Breen all wore masks). In return, they gave the Breen both poles of Ferenginar, several comets, and a frozen moon.

Other appearances
A Breen participated in the palio on Deep Space 3, according to "Interface", a 1993 seventh season Next Generation  episode.

Breen privateers attacked Free Haven, a Bajoran colony, in "To the Death", a 1996 fourth season Deep Space Nine episode.

A Breen appeared on Star Trek: Voyager as a hologram enhanced by the Hirogen, in the seventh-season episode "Flesh and Blood".

The Breen function as a common recurring enemy for the Federation and the Klingon Empire in Star Trek: Online.

A Breen is one of the main characters in Star Trek: Renegades, a fan film posted to YouTube.

The Breen occupy the depopulated planet Brekka and attack the U.S.S. Cerritos in "Trusted Sources", a 2022 third season Lower Decks episode.

Reception
In June 2014, Charlie Jane Anders, writing for io9, ranked the Breen as the tenth least threatening villains of Star Trek, calling them "one of the bigger letdowns of Star Trek." Anders cited how the race was built up as a supposedly formidable race, with an energy-dampening weapon that disabled enemy ships, only for the Federation to quickly devise a countermeasure to it, after which the Breen's status as opponents faded.

References

External links 

Star Trek species
Fictional warrior races
Fictional elements introduced in 1991